Bollène (Provençal: Bouleno) is a commune in the Vaucluse department in the Provence-Alpes-Côte d'Azur region in southeastern France.

Geography 
Bollène is a commune located in the north of the Vaucluse department next to the junction of Drôme, Ardèche and Gard departments. Located near major communication routes, the city (old town) occupies the northern end of a sandstone plateau where lie the communes of Mondragon, Mornas, Uchaux and Lagarde-Paréol. The rest of the town, including the lower town, stretches over a fertile plain which rests on a large layer of clay.

Population

Twin towns
Bollène is twinned with L'Alcúdia, Spain, since 1994.

See also

Communes of the Vaucluse department
Tricastin Nuclear Power Center
Félix Charpentier. Sculptor of Bollène War Memorial

References

Communes of Vaucluse